The filefish (Monacanthidae) are a diverse family of tropical to subtropical tetraodontiform marine fish, which are also known as foolfish, leatherjackets or shingles. They live in the Atlantic, Pacific and Indian Oceans. Filefish are closely related to triggerfish, pufferfish and trunkfish.

The filefish family comprises approximately 102 species in 27 genera. More than half of the species are found in Australian waters, with 58 species in 23 genera.

Their laterally compressed bodies and rough, sandpapery skin inspired the filefish's common name. It is said that dried filefish skin was once used to finish wooden boats.

Description
Appearing very much like their close relatives the triggerfish, filefish are rhomboid-shaped, with beautifully elaborate cryptic patterns. Deeply keeled bodies give a false impression of size when the fish are viewed facing the flanks. Filefish have soft, simple fins, with comparatively small pectoral fins and truncated, fan-shaped tail fins; a slender, retractable spine crowns the head. Although there are usually two of these spines, the second spine is greatly reduced, being used only to lock the first spine in the erect position. That gives rise to the family name Monacanthidae, from the Greek monos meaning "one" and akantha meaning "thorn". Some species also have recurved spines on the base of the tail (caudal peduncle).

The small terminal mouths of filefish have specialized incisor teeth on the upper and lower jaw. In the upper jaw there are four teeth in the inner series and six in the outer series. In the lower jaw, there are four to six in an outer series only. The snout is tapered and projecting and the eyes are located high on the head. Filefish have rough non-overlapping scales with small spikes, which is why they are called filefish. Although scaled, some filefish have such small scales that they appear scaleless. Like the triggerfish, filefish have small gill openings and greatly elongated pelvic bones, creating a "dewlap" of skin running between the bone's sharply keeled termination and the belly. The pelvis is articulated with other bones of the "pelvic girdle" and is capable of moving upwards and downwards in many species to form a large dewlap, which is used to make the fish appear much deeper in the body than is actually the case. Some filefish erect the dorsal spine and pelvis simultaneously to make it more difficult for a predator to remove them from a cave.

There is marked sexual dimorphism in some species, with the sexes possessing different coloration, different body shapes, and the males with larger caudal spines and bristles.

Habitat and life history

Adult filefish are generally shallow water fish, inhabiting depths of no more than about 30 metres. They may be found in lagoons or associated with seaward reefs and seagrass beds; some species may also enter estuaries. Some species are closely associated with dense mats of sargassum, a particularly ubiquitous "sea weed"; these filefish, notably the planehead filefish (Stephanolepis hispidus) are also coloured and patterned to match their weedy environments.

Either solitary, in pairs or small groups depending on the species, filefish are not terribly good swimmers; their small fins confine the fish to a sluggish gait. Filefish are often observed drifting head downward amongst stands of seaweed, presumably in an effort to fool both predator and prey alike. When threatened, filefish may retreat into crevices in the reef.

The feeding habits of filefish vary among the species, with some eating only algae and seagrass; others also eat small benthic invertebrates, such as tunicates, gorgonians, and hydrozoans; and some species eat corals (corallivores). It is the latter two habits which have largely precluded the introduction of filefish into the aquarium hobby.

Filefish spawn at bottom sites prepared and guarded by the males; both he and the female may guard the brood, or the male alone, depending on the species. The young filefish are pelagic; that is, they frequent open water. Sargassum provides a safe retreat for many species, both fish and weed being at the current's mercy. Juvenile filefish are at risk from predation by tuna and dolphinfish.

Filefish as food
In FAO fisheries statistics, the largest category of filefish are Cantherhines spp. with annual landings around 200,000 tonnes in recent years, mostly by China. Landings of threadsail filefish (Stephanolepis cirrhifer) and smooth leatherjacket (Meuschenia scaber) are reported at species level, with the rest as "Filefishes, leatherjackets nei" (nei=not elsewhere included).

Threadsail Filefish (Stephanolepis cirrhifer)  is a popular snack food in Korea. It is typically dried and made into a sweet and salty jerky called jwipo (쥐포), which is then roasted before eating.

Genera 

 Acanthaluteres
 Acreichthys
 Aluterus
 Amanses
 Anacanthus
 Arotrolepis
 Brachaluteres
 Cantherhines
 Cantheschenia
 Chaetodermis
 Colurodontis
 Enigmacanthus
 Eubalichthys
 Lalmohania
 Meuschenia
 Monacanthus
 Navodon
 Nelusetta
 Oxymonacanthus
 Paraluteres
 Paramonacanthus
 Pervagor
 Pseudalutarius
 Pseudomonacanthus
 Rudarius
 Scobinichthys
 Stephanolepis
 Thamnaconus

See also
List of fish common names
List of fish families

References